The 2015–16 Lehigh Mountain Hawks men's basketball team represents Lehigh University during the 2015–16 NCAA Division I men's basketball season. The Mountain Hawks, led by ninth year head coach Brett Reed, play their home games at Stabler Arena and were members of the Patriot League. They finished the season 17–15, 13–5 in Patriot League play to finish in second place. They advanced to the championship game of the Patriot League tournament where they lost to Holy Cross.

Previous season
The Mountain Hawks finished the season 16–14, 10–8 in Patriot League play to finish in third place. They lost in the quarterfinals of the Patriot League tournament to American.

Departures

Incoming recruits

2016 class recruits

Roster

Schedule

|-
!colspan=9 style="background:#502D0E; color:#FFFFFF;"| Non-conference regular season

|-
!colspan=9 style="background:#502D0E; color:#FFFFFF;"| Patriot League regular season

|-
!colspan=9 style="background:#502D0E; color:#FFFFFF;"| Patriot League tournament

References

Lehigh Mountain Hawks men's basketball seasons
Lehigh